Jonynas (masculine), Jonynienė (feminine married), Jonynaitė (feminine unmarried) is a Lithuanian surname.  Notable people with the surname include:

 (1923-1976), Lithuanian poet
 (born 1953), Lithuanian poet
Ignas Jonynas, Lithuanian historian
Vytautas Kazimieras Jonynas, Lithuanian artist

See also

Lithuanian-language surnames